Pangandaran is a town and district of Pangandaran Regency within the province of West Java, Indonesia. It is located on the southern coast of the island of Java. A well-known surfing beach has made Pangandaran a popular tourist destination.

History

On 17 July 2006, an undersea earthquake measuring 7.7 on the moment magnitude scale triggered a tsunami which engulfed the resort area and caused destruction as far inland as half a kilometre. Over three hundred people from the town were killed.

Tourism

Pangandaran is a large fishing village situated on a narrow isthmus with Pangandaran National Park occupying the entire headland.

On either side to the east and to the west of Pangandaran village and the National Park isthmus are two beaches of volcanic black sand.

The Penanjung Pangandaran nature reserve is nearby on a peninsula connected to the mainland by a narrow neck of land. The isthmus is around 200 m wide. About eighty percent of the nature reserve is secondary rainforest. The flora of the nature reserve includes the Rafflesia.

The Pangandaran International Kite Festival has been held since 1985.

Transportation
Nusawiru Airport is located nearby and provides facilities for a domestic service to Jakarta.

Climate
Pangandaran has a tropical rainforest climate (Af) with heavy to very heavy rainfall year-round.

References

External links 

 
 Photographs of the effect of the tsunami of 17 July 2006 on Pangandaran

Districts of West Java
Beaches of Indonesia
Populated places in West Java